North Battleford/Hamlin Airport  was located  north-east of Hamlin, Saskatchewan, Canada, in the RM of North Battleford No. 437.

History 
This airfield was built under the British Commonwealth Air Training Plan during World War II as the R1 - primary relief field - for RCAF Station North Battleford. Pilots trained here using Airspeed Oxford aircraft; it is listed as operating from 4 September 1941 to 30 March 1945.

Airodrome 
The site was located north-east of the community of Hamlin, Saskatchewan. The Relief field was constructed in the typical triangular pattern. 

Six runways were listed as follows:

A review of Google Maps on 7 June 2018 shows clear visibility of the outer runways of the airfield. There is, however, no visibility of the inner runways. The c.1942 indicate a location on the visible triangle.

Post-war, 1945–2007
More recently, one runway continued to be maintained for use in agricultural flight training by Battlefords Airspray.

2007–present 
As of 15 March 2007, this airport is not usable and has been removed from the Canada Flight Supplement.

See also 
 List of airports in Saskatchewan
 North Battleford Airport
 List of defunct airports in Canada

References

North Battleford Hamlin Airport
Military installations closed in 1945
Hamlin
North Battleford No. 437, Saskatchewan
Military airbases in Saskatchewan
Royal Canadian Air Force stations